St. Paul's High School, Hajipur is a private school. It is affiliated with the Central Board of Secondary Education. The School has become a leading educational institution of Bihar. Its performance in academic and other activities and its calm & discipline atmosphere conducive to the pursuit of learning became a center of attraction. It is the best school in Vaishali district . It has 9th rank in Bihar .It also fetches the ‘292th’ rank in all Indian school ranking.

History
SPS Hajipur was founded by Dr Radha Kumar before 1985.

Infrastructure
St. Paul's High School is running in its own big building having more than 50 big rooms in 1,40,000 sq.ft. Covered area in the form of three Story Building. It has sufficient number of Class-Rooms, Labs-Room, Demonstration-Room, Language lab, Community Display Room, Auditorium, Audio Visual Aid facilities, Examination Hall, Common Room, Record Room, Recreation Rooms and Visitors Rooms.

It has well-stacked library with more than 2,000 volumes of books and a good number of journals and periodicals are subscribed for the benefit of the students and staff. The Reference Section has a variety of standard encyclopedias, dictionaries and standard reference books on almost all topics at the school level.

References

External links
 school website

High schools and secondary schools in Bihar
Christian schools in Bihar
Education in Hajipur
Educational institutions established in 1999
1999 establishments in Bihar